The 1937 Utah State Aggies football team was an American football team that represented Utah State Agricultural College in the Rocky Mountain Conference (RMC) during the 1937 college football season. In their 19th season under head coach Dick Romney, the Aggies compiled a 2–4–2 record (2–4–1 against RMC opponents), finished seventh in the RMC, and were outscored by a total of 152 to 47.

Schedule

References

Utah State
Utah State Aggies football seasons
Utah State Aggies football